Anthothelidae is a family of corals, a member of the phylum Cnidaria.

Genera
Genera in this family include:
 Alertigorgia Kükenthal, 1908
 Anthothela Verrill, 1879
 Briareopsis Bayer, 1993
 Erythropodium Kölliker, 1865
 Iciligorgia Duchassaing, 1870
 Lateothela Moore, Alderslade & Miller, 2017
 Solenocaulon Gray, 1862
 Stereogorgia
 Tubigorgia Pasternak, 1985
 Victorgorgia Lopez Gonzalez & Briand, 2002
 Williamsium Moore, Alderslade & Miller, 2017

References

 
Scleraxonia
Cnidarian families